The 1949 Railway Cup Hurling Championship was the 23rd series of the inter-provincial hurling Railway Cup. Three matches were played between 13 February 1949 and 17 March 1949 to decide the title. It was contested by Connacht, Leinster, Munster and Ulster.

Munster entered the championship as the defending champions.

On 17 March 1949, Munster won the Railway Cup after a 5-03 to 2-09 defeat of Connacht in the final at Croke Park, Dublin. It was their 17th Railway Cup title overall and their second title in succession. The attendance of 40,091 set a new record for the Railway Cup finals.

Connacht's Josie Gallagher was the Railway Cup top scorer with 3-09.

Results

Semi-finals

Final

Top scorers

Overall

Single game

Sources

 Donegan, Des, The Complete Handbook of Gaelic Games (DBA Publications Limited, 2005).

References

Railway Cup Hurling Championship
Railway Cup Hurling Championship